The  NM-method or Naszodi–Mendonca method is the operation that can be applied in statistics, econometrics, economics, sociology, and demography to construct counterfactual contingency tables. The method finds the matrix   which is “closest” to matrix  ( called the seed table) in the sense of being ranked the same but with the row and column totals of a target matrix  .

Since the solution for matrix  is unique, the NM-method is a  function:  , where  is an all one row vector of size , while  is an all one column vector of size .

The  NM-method was developed by Naszodi and Mendonca (2021) to solve for matrix  in problems, where matrix  is not a sample from the population characterized by the row totals and column totals of matrix , but represents another population.

Definition of matrix ranking
The closeness between two matrices of the same size can be defined in several ways. The Euclidean distance, and the Kullback-Leibler divergence are two well-known examples.
   
The NM-method is consistent with a definition relying on the ordinal Liu-Lu index  which is the slightly modified version of the Coleman-index defined by Eq. (15) in Coleman (1958). According to this definition, matrix  is closest to matrix , if their Liu-Lu values are the same. In other words, if they are ranked the same by the ordinal Liu-Lu index.

If matrix  is a 2-by-2 matrix, its  scalar-valued Liu-Lu index is defined as
 
 , where 
;  
; 
; 
; 
.

 
For matrix   of size n-by-m, the Liu-Lu index was generalized by Naszodi and Mendonca (2021) to a matrix-valued index. One of the  preconditions for the generalization is that the row variable and the column variable of matrix  have to be ordered.

Constraints on the row totals and column totals

Solution

.

So, this is how the NM-method works for 2-by-2 seed tables.

For  , and   matrices of size  ,   the solution is obtained by dichotomizing their ordered row variable and ordered column variable in all possible meaningful ways before solving   number of problems of 2-by-2 form. The set of solutions determine  number of  entries of matrix . Its remaining  elements are uniquely determined by the target row totals and column totals.

However, the corresponding concept of matrix ranking is slightly different from the one  discussed above.

A numerical example

 
It yields the following 9 matrices of size 2-by-2 with their target row totals and column totals:

The next step is to calculate the generalized matrix-valued Liu-Lu index , (where   ) by applying the formula of the original scalar-valued Liu-Lu index to each of the 9 matrices: 

Apparently, matrix  is positive. Therefore, the NM-method is defined. Solving each of the 9 problems of the 2-by-2 form yields 9 entries of the  matrix. Its other 7 entries are uniquely determined  by the target row totals and column totals.

Implementation
The NM-method is implemented in Excel, Visual Basic, and R. It can be downloaded from Mendeley (currently in version 2).

Applications
The NM-method can be applied to study  various phenomena including assortative mating, intergenerational mobility as a type of social mobility,  residential segregation, recruitment and talent management.

Although the NM-method has a wide range of applicability, all the examples to be presented next are about assortative mating along the education level. In these applications, the two preconditions (of ordered trait variable, and positive assortative mating in all educational groups) are not debated to be met.   
    
Assume that  matrix  characterizes the joint educational distribution of husbands and wives in Zimbabwe, while matrix   characterizes the same in Yemen. Matrix  to be constructed with the NM-method tells us what would be the joint educational distribution of couples in Zimbabwe, if the educational distributions of husbands and wives were the same as in Yemen, while the overall desire for homogamy (also called as aggregate marital preferences in economics, or marital matching social norms/social barriers in sociology) were unchanged. 
    
In a  second application, matrices  and  characterize the same country in two different years. Matrix  is the joint educational distribution of American newlyweds in 2040, where the husbands are from Generation Z and being young adults when observed.  Matrix  is the same but for Generation Y observed in year 2024. By constructing matrix , one can study in the future what would be the educational distribution among the just married American young couples if they sorted into marriages the same way as the males in Generation Z and their partners do, while the education level were the same as among the males in  Generation Y and their partners. 
 
In a  third application, matrices  and  characterize again the same country in two different years. In this application, matrix  is the joint educational distribution of Portuguese young couples (where the male partners' age is between 30 and 34 years) in 2011.  And  is the same but it is observed in year 1981. One may aim to construct matrix  in order to study what would have been the educational distribution of Portuguese young couples if they had sorted into marriages like their peers did in 2011, while their gender-specific educational distributions were the same as in 1981.

In each of the first two applications, matrix  represents a counterfactual joint distribution. It can be used to quantify certain  ceteris paribus effects. More precisely, to quantify on a cardinal scale the difference  between the directly unobservable degree of marital sorting in Zimbabwe and Yemen, or in Generation Z and Generation Y with a counterfactual decomposition.  For the decomposition, the counterfactual table  is used to calculate the contribution of each of the driving forces (i.e., the observed structural availability of potential partners with various education levels determining the opportunities at the population level; and the unobservable aggregate matching preferences/desires/norms/barriers) and that of their interaction (i.e., the effect of changes in aggregate preferences/desires/norms/barriers due to changes in structural availability) to an observable cardinal scaled statistics (e.g. the share of educationally homogamous couples).

The third application was used by Naszodi and Mendonca (2021) as an example for a non-sense counterfactual: the education level has changed so drastically in Portugal over the three decades studied that this counterfactual is impossible to be obtained.

Some features of the NM-method
First, the NM-method does not yield a meaningful solution if it reaches the limit of its applicability.  For instance, in the third application, the NM-method signals with a negative entry in matrix  that the counterfactual is impossible (see: AlternativeMethod_US_1980s_2010s_age3035_main.xls Sheet PT_A1981_P2011_Not_meaningful). In this respect, the NM-method is similar to the linear probability model that signals the same with a predicted probabiity outside the unit interval .

Third, the NM-method works even if there are zero entries in matrix .

Comparison with the IPF
The iterative proportional fitting procedure (IPF) is also a function:. It is the operation of finding the fitted matrix   which fulfills a set of conditions similar to those met by matrix  constructed with the NM-method.  E.g.,  matrix  is the closest to  matrix  but with the row and column totals of the target matrix .

However, there are differences between the IPF and the NM-method. The IPF defines closeness of matrices of the same size by the cross-entropy, or the Kullback-Leibler divergence.

The following numerical example highlights that the IPF and the NM-method are not identical: .

The NM-method yields the following matrix : 

Whereas the solution for matrix   obtained with the IPF is:

The IPF is equivalent to the maximum likelihood estimator of a joint population distribution, where matrix   (the estimate for the joint population distribution) is calculated from matrix , the observed joint distribution in a random sample taken from the population characterized by the row totals and column totals of matrix . In contrast to the problem solved by the IPF, matrix  is not sampled from this population in the problem that the NM-method was developed to solve. In fact, in the NM-problem,  matrices   and  characterize two different populations (either observed simultaneously like in the application for Zimbabwe and Yemen, or observed in two different points in time like in its application for the populations of Generation Z and Generation Y). This difference facilitates the choice between the NM-method and the IPF in empirical applications.

Deming and Stephan(1940), the inventors of the IPF, illustrated the application of their method on a classic maximum likelihood estimation problem, where  matrix  was sampled from the population characterized by the row totals and column totals of matrix . They were aware of the fact that in general, the IPF is not suitable for counterfactual predictions: they explicitly warned that their algorithm is “not by itself useful for prediction” (see Stephan and Deming 1940 p. 444).

Finally, the domains are different for which the IPF and the NM-method yield solutions. First, unlike the NM-method, the IPF does not provide a solution for all seed tables   with zero entries (Csiszár (1975) found necessary and sufficient conditions for general tables having zero entries). Second, unlike the IPF, the NM-method does not provide a meaningful solution for pairs of  matrices   and   defining impossible counterfactuals. Third, the precondition of the NM-method (of either  or ) is not a precondition for the applicability of the IPF.

See also
Iterative proportional fitting procedure

RAS algorithm

References 

Contingency table